Shalysa Wray (born 6 May 1999) is a Caymanian sprinter.

Biography
Shalysa Wray was born on 6 May 1999. She placed fourth in the 200 m at the 2019 NACAC U23 Championships in Athletics, and fourth at the 400 m in 2021.

Wray competed in the 400m at the 2020 Summer Olympics, becoming the first Caymanian athlete to compete at the Olympics in this event. She finished seventh in her heat, with a personal best time of 53.61 seconds, and did not advance to the semi-finals.

She is a student at Kansas State University.

References

External links 
 

1999 births
Living people
Caymanian female sprinters
Athletes (track and field) at the 2020 Summer Olympics
Olympic athletes of the Cayman Islands